Georgetown is a home rule-class city in Scott County, Kentucky, United States. The population was 37,086 at the 2020 census. It is the 6th-largest city by population in the U.S. state of Kentucky. It is the seat of its county. It was originally called Lebanon when founded by Rev. Elijah Craig and was renamed in 1790 in honor of President George Washington. It is the home of Georgetown College, a private liberal arts college. Georgetown is part of the Lexington-Fayette, KY Metropolitan Statistical Area. At one time the city served as the training camp home for the NFL's Cincinnati Bengals.

The city's growth began in the mid-1980s, when Toyota built Toyota Motor Manufacturing Kentucky, its first wholly owned United States plant, in Georgetown. The plant opened in 1988; it builds the Camry, Camry Hybrid, Avalon, Lexus ES, and RAV4 Hybrid automobiles.

History

Native peoples have lived along the banks of Elkhorn Creek in what is now Scott County for at least 15,000 years. At the time of European encounter, the historic Shawnee people occupied this area.

Anglo-American exploration can be dated to the late colonial period and a June 1774 surveying expedition from Fincastle County, Virginia, led by Colonel John Floyd. He named it Royal Spring but did not settle it. John McClellan was the first English colonist to settle the area and established McClellan's Station there in 1775, but the compound was abandoned following an Indian attack on December 29, 1776.

In 1782, the Baptist preacher Elijah Craig led his congregation to the site from Orange County, Virginia, and established a new settlement which he called Lebanon. This was incorporated by the Virginia legislature in 1784. At the time, Virginia claimed this territory under its colonial charter. Craig established some of the first mills west of the Appalachian Mountains along the Royal Spring Branch, where he also manufactured cloth and paper. He also founded a distillery in 1789, as well as a school called the Rittenhouse Academy. This eventually developed as Georgetown College.

The city's name was changed to George Town in honor of President George Washington in 1790. When Kentucky became the 15th U.S. state in 1792 and formed Scott County, George Town became the county seat. Its name was formally changed to Georgetown in 1846.

The county developed an agricultural economy, as it was part of the fertile Bluegrass Region. Planters cultivated tobacco and hemp, and raised blooded livestock, including Thoroughbred racehorses, and cattle and sheep. During the Civil War, Kentucky stayed in the Union. Georgetown was raided by Confederate Gen. John Hunt Morgan twice, once on July 15, 1862, and the second time on July 10, 1864.

Following the war, the town became a railroad hub, connected to the Cincinnati Southern, the Louisville Southern, and the Frankfort & Cincinnati. The last was considered the "whiskey route" and carried much of the region's bourbon to markets along the Ohio River.

In 1896 a girl's academy was founded by the Catholic Sisters of Visitation. The school closed in 1987, and was adapted as the Cardome Centre. It previously served as a community center for the city of Georgetown, but was purchased by the Catholic Diocese of Lexington in 2019.

20th century to present
Throughout the 20th century, Georgetown has been in transition from an economy based primarily on agriculture, to one mixing manufacturing, small business, and the family farm. During the 1960s, the construction of Interstate 75 placed the city on one of the nation's busiest highways. The selection of Georgetown as the site of Toyota Motor Manufacturing Kentucky in 1985 has resulted in the greatest period of growth in the city's history.

The historic Ward Hall, now home to The Ward Hall Preservation Foundation, is located just outside Georgetown. Ward Hall was the summer home of Junius Ward. The home represents the height of the Greek Revival period of architecture in Kentucky and is listed on the National Register of Historic Places (NRHP).

The Georgetown business section has a historic district known as the Oxford Historic District. It is also listed on the NRHP.

Geography
Georgetown is located north of Lexington in the Bluegrass region of the state. Major highways that run through the city include Interstate 75 and US Routes 25, 62, and 460. Numerous state highways run through the city. I-75 runs to the east of downtown, with access from exits 125, 126, 127, and 129. US 25 runs through the center of town, leading south to Lexington and north  to Corinth. US 62 runs along the southern and eastern part of the city as a bypass, leading northeast  to Cynthiana and southwest  to Midway. US 460 runs east−west through the town, leading east  to Paris and west  to Frankfort, the state capital.

Climate
Georgetown has a humid subtropical climate (Köppen Cfa), with warm summers and moderately cold winters.

Demographics

2010 census
As of the census of 2010, there were 29,098 people 10,733 households, and 7,452 families in the city. There were 11,957 housing units. The racial makeup of the city was 87.5% White, 7.0% African American, 0.3% Native American, 1.2% Asian, 0.0% Pacific Islander, 1.9% from other races, and 2.1% from two or more races. Hispanics or Latinos of any race were 4.3% of the population.

There were 10,733 households, out of which 38.1% had children under the age of 18 living with them, 49.6% were married couples living together, 14.9% had a female householder with no husband present, and 30.6% were non-families. 24.9% of all households were made up of individuals, and 6.6% had someone living alone who was 65 years of age or older. The average household size was 2.59 and the average family size was 3.09.

The age distribution was 27.9% under 18 and 8.3% who were 65 or older. The median age was 31.7 years. The median income for a household in the city was $51,692. The per capita income for the city was $24,376. About 13.9% of the population was below the poverty line.

Economy

Top employers
According to the city's 2018 Comprehensive Annual Financial Report, the largest employers in the city are:

Arts and culture
Georgetown has a lending library, the Scott County Public Library.

Education

Georgetown College is a private liberal arts college located in the downtown area of Georgetown. Baptist Seminary of Kentucky is a seminary in Georgetown.

Public education in Georgetown and Scott County consists of a preschool center serving special needs and economically at-risk students aged 3–5, nine elementary schools (grades K–5), three middle schools (grades 6–8) and two high schools (grades 9–12). These schools are all part of the Scott County Schools system. Plans had been in progress for an additional high school and middle school within the city limits during the 2010s due to the expanding population. The district chose not to build a new middle school, opting instead to expand one of its three existing middle schools, but opened a new high school and a new elementary school in 2019. Scott County High School also houses a separate (though still attached) wing for students in the ninth grade, called the Ninth Grade Center, which was developed to ease the transition for students between middle school and high school. Elkhorn Crossing School, which had been a detached campus of Scott County High before the 2019 opening of Great Crossing High School, provides some sophomores and juniors at both high schools with a curriculum that integrates academic and career-based disciplines. Another unique feature, the Alternative School, is also part of the Scott County High School educational complex. The Alternative School strives to educate students who may have difficulties in a normal classroom setting (for example, those with disciplinary or other concerns).

Public schools located within Georgetown and Scott County include:

 Creekside Elementary School
 Garth Elementary
 Northern Elementary
 Southern Elementary
 Eastern Elementary
 Western Elementary
 Anne Mason Elementary
 Stamping Ground Elementary
 Lemons Mill Elementary
 Royal Spring Middle School
 Georgetown Middle School
 Scott County Middle School
 Great Crossing High School
 Scott County High School
 Phoenix Horizon Academy

Private education in Georgetown and Scott County includes St. John elementary and middle school, Providence Christian Academy elementary and middle school, and Keystone Montessori elementary school.

Media
Georgetown's newspaper, the Georgetown News-Graphic, prints on Tuesday and Friday. Residents of the area commonly subscribe to this locally geared newspaper in addition to the larger Lexington daily newspaper, the Lexington Herald-Leader.

Infrastructure

Healthcare
Georgetown has one hospital, Georgetown Community Hospital, operated by LifePoint Health.

UK HealthCare and Baptist Health Lexington have regional campuses in Georgetown. Georgetown also has many nursing facilities, including Signature HealthCARE of Georgetown, Windsor Gardens Retirement Community, and Dover Manor Nursing Home.

Notable people
 William E. Applegate (1851–1928) – thoroughbred bookmaker, breeder, racer and track owner. Born in Georgetown.
 Mike Ayers (1948– ) – former football coach for East Tennessee State University and Wofford College
 Benjamin Franklin Bradley (1825−1897) – politician, representative to the Confederate States Congress from Kentucky. Born in Georgetown.
 Mary Cyrene Burch Breckinridge (1826–1907) – wife of Vice-President John C. Breckinridge. Born in Georgetown.
 Stephen G. Burbridge (1831–1894) – U.S. Army major general during the Civil War. Born in Georgetown.
 Benjamin T. Cable (1853–1923) – politician, US Representative from Illinois. Born in Georgetown.
 J. Campbell Cantrill (1870–1923) – politician, US Representative from Kentucky. Born in Georgetown.
 James E. Cantrill (1839–1908) – politician, Lt. Governor of Kentucky, judge
 Jean Murrell Capers (1913−2017) - Ohio state judge and Cleveland City Council member. Born in Georgetown.
 Patricia Cooksey (1958– ) – jockey and horse racing commentator
 Camille Cooper (1979– ) – WNBA player and attorney
 Joe Cowley (baseball) (1958– ) – former Major League Baseball pitcher, who threw a no-hitter
 Elijah Craig (1738−1808) – early Baptist preacher, educator and entrepreneur; worked on protecting religious freedom with James Madison of Virginia
 Basil W. Duke (1838−1916) – lawyer and Confederate general officer during the Civil War. Born in Georgetown.
 Sandford C. Faulkner (1803–1874) – composer of the song "The Arkansas Traveler". Born in Georgetown.
 Ukari Figgs (1977– ) – WNBA player and engineer
 Eleanor Flexner (1908–1995) – feminist scholar and author. Born in Georgetown.
 James Marion Frost (1848–1916) – pastor and author. Born in Georgetown.
 A. W. Hamilton (1980− ) – head men's basketball coach at Eastern Kentucky University
 William H. Hatch (1833−1896) – politician, US Representative from Missouri. Born in Georgetown.
 John Hunter Herndon (1813–1878) – Texas lawyer, judge and railroad president. Born in Georgetown.
 Harrison E. Howe (1881–1942) – chemical engineer, editor and author. Born in Georgetown.
 Tom L. Johnson (1854−1911) – US Representative from Ohio 1891–95, Mayor of Cleveland 1901–1909. Born in Georgetown.
 James McHall Jones (1823–1851) – US District Judge. Born in Georgetown.
 Larry D (1984– ) – professional wrestler and promoter
 Amy McGrath (1975– ) − US Marine aviator and politician
 Broadus Mitchell (1892–1988) – historian, author and professor. Born in Georgetown.
 Fountain E. Pitts (1808–1874) – influential Methodist minister. Born in Georgetown.
 Charles Edward Pogue (1950– ) – screenwriter, playwright and actor
 Dale Polley (1965– ) – former Major League Baseball pitcher
 Phillip Pratt (1955– ) – politician in the Kentucky House of Representatives from the 62nd district
 Ryan Quarles (1983– ) – politician, Agriculture Commissioner of Kentucky
 Dallas Robinson (1982– ) − 2014 Olympian-soldier; sole Olympian from Kentucky in the Sochi Russia Games
 James Fisher Robinson (1800−1882) – politician, 22nd Governor of Kentucky. Federal Governor during the Civil War. Cardome in Georgetown was his family home.
 John McCracken Robinson (1794−1893) – politician, US Senator from Illinois. Born in Georgetown.
 Nancy Schoonmaker (1873–1965) – author, politician and suffragist. Born in Georgetown.
 Jackson Showalter (1859–1935) – five-time U.S. chess champion
 Nellie Showalter (1870–1946) – American women's chess champion
 Gustavus Woodson Smith (1821−1896) – General in the Confederate Army during the Civil War; Confederate Secretary of War in 1862
 Hayden Stevenson (1877–1952) – film actor. Born in Georgetown.
 Barton W. Stone (1772−1844) – Presbyterian and Restorationist preacher of the Second Great Awakening; founded the Restoration Movement with Alexander Campbell
 Steve Zahn (1967− ) – actor; lives on a  horse farm near Georgetown

Photo gallery

Sister city
Georgetown has one sister city, as designated by Sister Cities International:
  Tahara, Aichi, Japan

References

External links

 Official city government site
 Official tourism site
 Georgetown/Scott County Chamber of Commerce

 
1784 establishments in Virginia  
Cities in Kentucky
County seats in Kentucky
Cities in Scott County, Kentucky
Lexington–Fayette metropolitan area